The FIS Snowboarding World Championships 2007 took place between January 14th and January 20th in Arosa, Switzerland.

Results

Men's Results

Snowboard Cross
The Snowboard Cross finals took place on January 14.

Parallel Giant Slalom
Parallel Giant Slalom finals took place on January 20.

Parallel Slalom
The Parallel Slalom finals took place on January 19.

Halfpipe
The finals took place on January 20.

Big Air
Big Air finals took place on January 19.

Women's Events

Snowboard Cross
The Snowboard Cross finals took place on January 14.

Parallel Giant Slalom
Parallel Giant Slalom finals took place on January 20.

Parallel Slalom
The Parallel Slalom finals took place on January 19.

Halfpipe
The finals took place on January 20.

Medal table

References

2007
2007 in Swiss sport